Minlino (Meñle) is a rural locality (a village) in Vanyshevsky Selsoviet, Burayevsky District, Bashkortostan, Russia. The population was 165 as of 2010. There are 4 streets.

Geography 
Minlino is located 20 km north of Burayevo (the district's administrative centre) by road. Asavtamak is the nearest rural locality.

References 

Rural localities in Burayevsky District